This is a list of properties and districts in Fannin County, Georgia that are listed on the National Register of Historic Places (NRHP).

Current listings

|}

References

Fannin
Buildings and structures in Fannin County, Georgia